The 2018 Campeonato Goiano  (officially the Campeonato Goiano de Profissionais da 1ª Divisão – Edição 2018) is the 76th edition of Goiás's top professional football league. The competition began on 17 January 2019 and end on 8 de abril 2018.

Participating teams

Format
In the first stage, the 10 teams were drawn into two groups of five teams each.

Final stage

Championship selection 

Goalkeeper: Marcelo Rangel (Goiás)
Right side: Maguinho (Vila Nova)
Defender: Mirita (Aparecidense)
Defender: Eduardo Brock (Goiás)
Left-Back: Marquinhos (Anapolina)
Defensive Midfield: Léo Sena (Goiás)
Centre-Forward: Elias (Iporá)
Centre-Forward: Esquerdinha (Anapolina)
Attacker: Alex Henrique (Aparecidense)
Attacker: Maranhão (Goiás)
Attacker: Nonato (Aparecidense)

Manager: Hélio dos Anjos (Goiás)
Championship star: Marcelo Rangel (Goiás)
Revelation: Madison (Goiás)

References

Campeonato Goiano seasons